Sarah Mariehelen Cousineau is an American physicist. In 2020, she was elected a Fellow of the American Physical Society for her "high-impact contributions to high-power proton accelerator research, inspiring workforce education and effective leadership in the physics of beams."

Early life and education
Cousineau completed her Bachelor of Science degree from the University of North Dakota and her graduate degrees from Indiana University. After earning her doctorate degree in accelerator physics from Indiana University, she joined Oak Ridge National Laboratory (ORNL) as a postdoctoral scientist.

Career
While serving in a joint appointment with ORNL and the University of Tennessee, Cousineau served as the group leader in the Research Accelerator Division at the Spallation Neutron Source. In this role, she oversaw and coordinated beam physics research efforts for the SNS accelerator. In 2018, she led a group of researchers to create the first-ever 6D measurement of an accelerator beam. In 2020, Cousineau was elected a Fellow of the American Physical Society for her "high-impact contributions to high-power proton accelerator research, inspiring workforce education and effective leadership in the physics of beams."

References

Living people
American women physicists
University of North Dakota alumni
Indiana University alumni
University of Tennessee faculty
Fellows of the American Physical Society
American women academics
Year of birth missing (living people)
21st-century American physicists
21st-century American women scientists